Isopropyl jojobate is the ester of isopropyl alcohol and the acids derived from jojoba oil. Isopropyl jojobate is commonly used in cosmetic formulations.

Chemical structure 
Isopropyl jojobate is the isopropyl ester of the unfractionated saponification product of jojoba oil. It consists of a mixture of jojoba alcohols and the esters of isopropyl alcohol and jojoba acids. There are typically also unsaponified wax esters present in isopropyl jojobate.

Physical properties 
Isopropyl jojobate is an odorless, pale amber liquid at room temperature. The viscosity of isopropyl jojobate is much lower than that of jojoba oil.

Uses 
Isopropyl jojobate is often used in cosmetic formulations as a pigment wetting agent and emollient. It is often found in lipsticks, eye shadows, blushers, foundations, (especially stick foundations) and hair dyes.

References

Cosmetics chemicals
Isopropyl esters
Fatty acid esters